Woodlawn, also known as the Thomas England House, was a historic home located near Smyrna, Kent County, Delaware.  It was first known as Morris Rambles when built in 1741 by James Morris of Philadelphia, Pennsylvania. In 1853, it was sold by Elizabeth Berry Morris (the granddaughter of James Morris) to cousin George Wilson Cummins. After extensive renovations, the mansion was renamed Woodlawn. It was a two-story, five-bay temple-fronted frame dwelling in the Greek Revival-style. It had a gable roof and featured a monumental pedimented portico supported by six Doric order columns.  It had a one-story kitchen wing with a low hipped roof.

It was listed on the National Register of Historic Places in 1982. 
The house was demolished on July 14, 2017, despite community efforts to preserve it.

References

External links

Houses on the National Register of Historic Places in Delaware
Greek Revival houses in Delaware
Houses completed in 1853
Houses in Kent County, Delaware
Historic American Buildings Survey in Delaware
National Register of Historic Places in Kent County, Delaware